Herbert "Harold" Pearson (7 January 1901 – 1972) was an English professional footballer who played at centre forward for Southampton and Coventry City in the 1920s.

Football career
Pearson was born in Brierley Hill where he played for  Brierley Hill Alliance in the Birmingham & District League.

In May 1923, he was signed by Southampton of the Football League Second Division as cover for Bill Rawlings. Pearson made his debut  at The Dell against Sheffield Wednesday on 15 September 1923, scoring twice in a 3–0 victory. Pearson retained his place for three more matches before Rawlings returned to the side. Although he was "quick and determined", he never received enough chances to establish himself in the first team and at the end of the season he was placed on the transfer list, at a suggested fee of £250.

In the summer of 1924, he joined Coventry City where he only made five appearances before dropping down to non-league football.

References

External links
Career details on www.11v11.com

1901 births
1972 deaths
People from Brierley Hill
English footballers
Southampton F.C. players
Coventry City F.C. players
Nuneaton Borough F.C. players
English Football League players
Association football forwards
Southern Football League players